Bulacao is a barangay in Gubat municipality, Sorsogon province, Philippines. Its population was 2,024 at the 2015 Census.

Description
Bulacao is a barangay in Gubat. An inland barangay, agriculture is the primary source of income here. Duck, poultry and hog raising are secondary sources of income.

Education
Primary school:
 Bulacao Elementary School
Note: Some parents from Cabigaan send their children here.

Secondary school:
 Bulacao National High School
Some students came from Cabigaan, Union, Gubat, and other inland barangays.

Transportation
Bulacao is easily accessible by tricycles and private vehicles due to good roads.

References

Sorsogon